The Platino Award for Best Actor (Spanish: Premio Platino al mejor actor / Premio Platino a la mejor interpretación masculina) is one of the Platino Awards, Ibero-America's film awards presented annually by the Entidad de Gestión de Derechos de los Productores Audiovisuales (EGEDA) and the Federación Iberoamericana de Productores Cinematográficos y Audiovisuales (FIPCA). 

It was first presented in 2014, with Mexican actor, Eugenio Derbez being the first recipient of the award, for his role as Valentín Bravo in Instructions Not Included. Until the 7th edition in 2020, male supporting performances were included in this category.

No actor has won this award more than once while actors Alfredo Castro and Ricardo Darín have received the most nominations for this award with four each, followed by Antonio de la Torre, Javier Gutiérrez Álvarez and Javier Cámara with three each. Darín is also the most nominated actor in the category without a win.

Spain holds the record of most wins in the category with five of the eight winners being Spanish actors. In 2021, the category for Best Supporting Actor was created. 2020 winner Antonio Banderas also received a nomination for the Academy Award for Best Actor for Pain and Glory.

In the list below the winner of the award for each year is shown first, followed by the other nominees.

Winners and nominees

2010s

2020s

See also
 Goya Award for Best Actor
 Goya Award for Best Supporting Actor

References

External links
Official site

Platino Awards
Awards established in 2014